was a Japanese politician who was Chief Cabinet Secretary on four separate occasions, and, as well as serving in various other cabinet positions, was also appointed as Speaker of the House of Representatives of Japan. He was also seen as an influential voice within the Liberal Democratic Party.

Early life
Fukunaga was born on 5 August 1910, in Koka, Shiga. He graduated from Tokyo Imperial University in 1933.

Career
After initially working in textiles, and rising to a management position, Fukunaga entered the world of politics and became deputy governor of Saitama Prefecture in 1947. In 1949, Fukunaga stood for election and became the representative from Saitama 5th (a seat he retained 15 times).

In his early years in politics, Fukunaga received extensive political tutoring from Shigeru Yoshida, and became a protégé of his, serving in his cabinet twice as Chief Cabinet Secretary. He then reprised that role in the cabinet of Eisaku Satō, serving as Chief Cabinet Secretary twice more, while he briefly served as Minister of Labour in the interim period under Hayato Ikeda. It was under Satō that Fukunaga came into his own, serving as Chair of the LDP General Council in the late 1960s, and playing a key role as a special ambassador in the Japanese government's response to the Lod Airport massacre.

In the 1970s, Fukunaga also served in the Tanaka and Fukuda cabinets, and a few years before his death was appointed Speaker of the House of Representatives of Japan, a post he retained until 1985. He remained a key figure within the party until his death. Fukunaga passed away on 31 May 1988.

Honours
Grand Cordon of the Order of the Rising Sun with Pauwlonia Flowers (1986)

References

External links

Historic Japanese cabinets (in Japanese), kantei.go.jp; accessed 30 January 2018.
Historic LDP Presidents, Secretaries General, Chairs of General Affairs Committee and of Policy Research Committee (in Japanese), geocities.co.jp/WallStreet-Stock/7643/; accessed 31 March 2018

|-

|-

|-

|-

1910 births
1988 deaths
Liberal Democratic Party (Japan) politicians
Speakers of the House of Representatives (Japan)
People from Shiga Prefecture
University of Tokyo alumni